is a Japanese actress and singer. She is a former member of the Hello! Project group Angerme.

Early life and background
Meimi Tamura's mother was a Troupe Organizer, and acted at Gunma Prefecture in Japan. Her elder sister, Karen Tamura, was also an actress.  Influence from her mother and sister inspired Meimi working to become an actress.

Career

2004–2010: Early acting career
Tamura's first public performance took place in the Concert Tour of Japanese Enka singer Kiyoshi Hikawa, on the stage in Okinawa Convention Center March 27, 2004, as a member of the Dodonpa Kids when she was five years old.

At age of 10 she was cast in the 2009 musical Shugo Chara as Yaya Yuiki.
After co-starring with then S/mileage members, Yuuka Maeda (who played Amu), Kanon Fukuda (who played Nadeshiko) and Ayaka Wada (who played a student and X-Egg) in this musical, she became a S/mileage fan herself, and she went to several S/mileage concerts.

2011–2016: Smileage and Angerme
On May 29, 2011, at S/mileage's major debut first anniversary event, producer Tsunku announced that new members will be added to the group and an audition was subsequently held by Up-Front Agency. Tamura, along with approximately 2,000 other contestants attended the first round of the audition held in Shibuya, Tokyo, in June 2011. Tamura was chosen to proceed to the second round with 49 other contestants on July 9, 2011. Only 12 contestants, including Tamura, made it to the third round. The third round last for two days in the form of a training camp, which took place in a remote location two hours away from Tokyo. Contestants had their dancing and vocal abilities assessed by choreographer Yoshiko, vocal coach Mariko Ueno and producer Tsunku. At the end of the third round, Tamura passed the audition with four other contestants (Akari Takeuchi, Rina Katsuta, Fuyuka Kosuga, and Kana Nakanishi). These five girls became S/mileage's sub-members On October 16, Tamura was promoted to official members of the group. With the name changed to ANGERME in 2014, Tamura continued as a main vocalist in the group until she graduated on May 30, 2016.

2016–present: Post-Angerme 
On December 13, Tamura auditioned for the role of Annie in Annie the Musical, but was unsuccessful in obtaining the part. On January 22, 2017, Tamura had been cast as Minako Honda on stage play Minako-taiyo ni Natta Utahime, which would run through May 17–21. On February 16, 2017, a media report confirmed that Tamura had left UP-FRONT GROUP and she was currently working as a freelance without a manager.

On April 1, Tamura announced she was cast in the Peacepit stage play Grand Guignol, the latest installment in playwright Suemitsu Kenichi's TRUMP series that also includes LILIUM -Lilium Shoujo Junketsu Kageki-. It would run from July 29 to August 20.

On May 1, Tamura joined the agency BMI. On September 29, Tamura appeared on TV Asahi's "Kanjani ∞ The Mozart Music King No.1 Decision Fight".

On October 15, she performed in the music theater show Funfair. It was revealed on Tamura's official website that she would be holding a limited birthday event on October 29 with two shows, to celebrate her 19th birthday. It was also announced that Tamura will be participating in the stage play Kyo no Hotarubi from November 3 to 26 at the Meijiza, one of the oldest theaters in Japan.

On August 21, 2018, a teaser trailer or short version video clip for her first solo release music video was posted on YouTube by Victor Entertainment.

From October 10 to October 25, Tamura performed as Jaquenetta in the Toho's production of Love's Labour's Lost -Koi no Honeorizon-, which is a Japanese version of The Public Theater's 2013 musical adaptation of Shakespeare's Love's Labour's Lost.

In February 2020, Tamura played as Maria in the musical West Side Story.

In June 2020, Meimi Tamura played the role of Amber Von Tussle in the musical Hairspray, she played the role again in 2022.

On March till April 2021, Tamura played the role of Nina Rosario in the musical In the Heights.

In August 2021, Tamura Meimi played the role of Pretti Pasha in the musical Everybody's Talking About Jamie.

In November 2021, Tamura played the role of Rizzo in the musical Grease.

From January 19 through January 23 2022, Tamura Meimi played a leading role in "Equal," a two-man play about childhood friends attempting to use alchemy to achieve immortality. "Equal" is traditionally performed with two men, and this marks the first time a production has been staged with two female leads. She is also set to star as Claudia in the play Claudia, a role Minako Honda had done before succumbing to cancer in 2005.

On September 9 2022, it was announced that Tamura Meimi would be starring as the role of Janis Sarkisian in the Japanese musical adaptation of Mean Girls, set to run in January and February 2023.

On September 17, it was announced that Tamura was cast in the role of Nancy Grahl in the Toho production "Da Ponte ~Mozart no Kage ni Kakureta Mou Hitori no Tensai~". The production will run preview performances From June 21 through June 25, 2023 and will run at the Tatemono Brillia Hall in Tokyo from July 9 through July 16, 2023.

Discography

Studio albums

Extended plays

Singles

Filmography

References

External links 
 

Angerme members
Japanese female idols
Japanese stage actresses
Living people
1998 births
Musicians from Gunma Prefecture